Seyyed Ahmadi (also Romanized as Seyyed Aḩmadī; also known as Seyyed Aḩmad) is a village in Deh Tall Rural District, in the Central District of Bastak County, Hormozgan Province, Iran. At the 2006 census, its population was 154, in 36 families.

References 

Populated places in Bastak County